Tauranga Moana are a grouping of Māori iwi (tribe) based in and around the Tauranga Harbour and Bay of Plenty. The grouping consists of Waitaha-a-Hei, Ngāti Ranginui, Ngāti Pūkenga and its hapu Ngāti Pūkenga ki Waiau, and Ngāi Te Rangi.

References

 
Iwi and hapū